Common sea-heath is a common name for several plants and may refer to:

Frankenia laevis, native to Europe and northern Africa
Frankenia pauciflora, native to Australia